John Pat Fanning was a Democratic member of the West Virginia Senate, representing the 6th District since 1996. He earlier served from his appointment in June 1968 through 1980, and from 1984 through 1988 and 1996–2012.

In 1988, Fanning was indicted on bribery and conspiracy charges as part of a grand jury investigation into corruption in Mingo County, part of Fanning's district.

References

External links
West Virginia Legislature - Senator John Pat Fanning official government website
Project Vote Smart - Senator John Pat Fanning (WV) profile
Follow the Money - John Pat Fanning
2008 2006 2004 2000 Senate campaign contributions

Democratic Party West Virginia state senators
1934 births
Living people
People from McDowell County, West Virginia
American funeral directors
21st-century American politicians